The Lynk & Co 05 is a compact crossover SUV produced by Geely and marketed under the Lynk & Co brand from 2020 in China.

Presentation 

The 05 was unveiled in November 2019 by the manufacturer by publishing on the canvas photos of its crossover. It is the coupé version of the 01, from which it takes up the front face as well as its interior, and it is  longer.

Technical characteristics 
The Lynk & Co 05 is based on the Compact Modular Architecture platform of the Swedish manufacturer Volvo, which is used for XC40.

Transmission is an eight-speed automatic transmission. Two turbocharged 1.5-litre three-cylinder engines was added to the lineup shortly after with one of the powertrains being a plug-in hybrid model.

A performance oriented variant called the 05+ was launched in August 2021. Powering the 05+ is a 2.0-liter turbocharged four-cylinder engine shared with the other 05 models. However, the engine of the 05+ was tweaked to pump out 265 hp and 280 lb-ft (380 Nm) of torque, as opposed to the 251 hp and 258 lb-ft (349 Nm) of standard models. Mated to the engine is an Aisin eight-speed automated manual transmission with four wheel drive. Top speed of the 05+ is 143 mph (230 km/h).

References

05
Crossover sport utility vehicles
Compact sport utility vehicles
Cars introduced in 2019
Front-wheel-drive vehicles
2020s cars